Lord Southborough may refer to:

 RNLB Lord Southborough (Civil Service No. 1) (ON 688), a British lifeboat
 Francis Hopwood, 1st Baron Southborough (1860–1947), British civil servant